Wobbly is the moniker of Jon Leidecker (born 1970) a San Francisco–based musician/composer of experimental electronic music.

Biography 
He has released works on Tigerbeat6, Illegal Art, Alku, Phthalo, and others. He has been producing music since 1987 and ongoing studio and live projects involve collaborations with People Like Us, Thomas Dimuzio, Kevin Blechdom, Tim Perkis, Matmos, The Weatherman of Negativland, and Dieter Moebius & Tim Story (composer). He is also a member of the Chopping Channel and Sagan.

In 2002, Leidecker was responsible for the first montage and final cleanup of the Keep the Dog album, That House We Lived In (2003).

In 2008, Leidecker worked on the podcast 'Variations' for the Museum of Contemporary Art in Barcelona. 'Variations' is an overview of the history of collage and the practice of 'sampling' through 20th century music.

In 2011, Leidecker joined the multimedia collective Negativland. With Negativland's Mark Hosler and Peter Conheim along with Doug Wellman, Leidecker produced "There Is No Don", a live tribute to the late Don Joyce and his work, on July 23, 2015. Jon continues to produce and host Don's Over the Edge weekly radio program.

In 2015, he joined Splendor Generator with Bill Thibault, Tim Perkis and Xopher Davidson (of ANTIMATTER).

Discography

References

External links

Variations #1. A series on Sampling Music by Jon Leidecker for Ràdio Web MACBA. Museu d'Art Contemporani de Barcelona.
Jon Leidecker lecture on sampling music and collage. Museu d'Art Contemporani de Barcelona.
Golden, Barbara. "Conversation with Tim Perkis and Wobbly." eContact! 12.2 — Interviews (2) (April 2010). Montréal: CEC.
_. "Conversation with Sagan (Wobbly)." eContact! 12.2 — Interviews (2) (April 2010). Montréal: CEC.

American male composers
21st-century American composers
American electronic musicians
Living people
Musicians from San Francisco
1970 births
21st-century American male musicians